is a Japanese television series in the Metal Hero Series franchise. It is the sequel to Juukou B-Fighter, taking place five years after the preceding B-Fighter series. Kabuto aired from 1996 to 1997. The action footage and props were used for the Beetleborgs Metallix series.

Plot
Five years after the destruction of Jamahl, Earth has returned to peace again.

This threat is realized when a Cosmo Academia exploration submarine comes across a fissure in the ocean floor, out of which rises a huge flying fortress of the ancient tribe Melzard. This clan has been resting for millennia and seeks to destroy mankind. Matriarch Mother Melzard sends her oldest sons Raija and Dezzle to lead the attack with Raija's Elebamamoth. By then, Guru has infused the Neo Insect Armor with Insect Power, creating the three Command Voicers to link three humans with the armor. Kengo Tachibana and Ran Ayukawa, who have been selected to wear the new armor, ready themselves and become B-Fighter Kuwagar and B-Fighter Tentou. But the person to become B-Fighter Kabuto had not been chosen when the remaining Command Voicer flies out the window. Ran and Kengo follow it to meet Kouhei Toba, a star athlete at his school who is losing badly to Elebammoth who froze the boy's sister as the last Command Voicer flies into his hand. Kengo and Ran are shocked that this high school student is to be B-Fighter Kabuto, but they go to him and teach him how to transform. He changes into Kabuto and the three of them attack Elebammoth and several henchmen, with Kabuto killing Elebammoth.

Refusing to accept defeat, Mother Melzard continues her attacks, with Raija and Dezzle working against each other in their attacks on the B-Fighters.

Characters

New Generation of B-Fighters
  is a 17-year-old (later 18 year-old) high-school student at Hijiri Sei High School in the second grade (3rd  grade later) who is dragged into the fight. A star athlete, Kouhei is a very courageous fighter, although he is sometimes impetuous. He lives with his younger sister Yui, whom he cares for and overprotects. As Kabuto (and like Blue Beet before him), Kouhei dons armor modeled after a Japanese rhinoceros beetle. Kabuto is the only B-Fighter who can wield the Astral Saber to become one with and gain control of the giant robot, Kabuterios. He is in love with Sophie. After the final battle, He leaves for the United States with Sophie for college studies and training in 2 New York offices of Cosmo Academia.
  is a serious, 22-year-old environment investigator. He originally had no respect for Kouhei, because Kouhei was chosen to become Kabuto instead of himself and Kouhei was younger, although they eventually became friends. As Kuwagar (and like G-Stag before him), Kengo donned armor modeled after a stag beetle. At the end of the series, Kuwagar was able to wield the Geist Axe and take control of the giant robot, Kuwaga Titan, which was formerly being used by Descorpion and Mother Melzard for evil but was not actually evil. In episode 11 is revealed who his father is a diplomat.
  is an 18-year-old cyber engineer, who sometimes thought too much about mechanics and ignored the natural side. She had feelings for Julio when he taught her to appreciate nature. Ran loved to eat and was skilled at playing the shamisen, a stringed Japanese instrument. She left her parents' home at 15. As Tentou (unlike Reddle before her), Ran's armor was modeled after a ladybug. After the death of her father, her mother moves to United States to study hotel management.

New B-Fighters
They consumed most of their power to destroy a crystal Mother Melzard had that ignited detonators inside various humans. Afterwards, their Insect Commanders merged with the Geist Axe in the finale.

 : Mac was from the New York office, a master of boxing and aikido chosen by the Dragonfly Insect Medal to become Yanma. He posed as an exchange student in Kouhei's school, becoming the boy's rival as a result. He eventually revealed himself as a B-Fighter when the three were attacked by B-Crushers, making an enemy out of Mukadelinger and losing to him until Kabuto comes to his aid. After giving him his Tonbou Gun, Mac left for America after telling them of the three other Insect Medals. Mac was outgoing, flirting with Japanese girls at every chance and pigging out on sushi. As Yanma, Mac's armor was modeled after a dragonfly.
  was a Peruvian archeologist/agent from the South American Cosmo Academia branch. He played a reed flute with strange powers that he gave to Ran as a memento of their time together. He was chosen by the Firefly Insect Medal to become Genji, whose armor was modeled after a firefly.
  is a 35-year-old from the Peking branch of Cosmo Academia. Li was an elementary schoolteacher who loved children and often put on magic shows in parks for children, and was also a good cook. He was a peaceful man who hated the fight between the B-Fighters and Melzard, and at first refused to cooperate when he obtained the Cicada Insect Medal. However, Kengo made him realize that the B-Fighters fight in order to stop the fighting, and so he agreed to help as Min, whose armor was modeled after a cicada.
  17 years-old who was born on 10 May 1979. From the Paris branch, Sophie was a master violinist at 14 years-old a study in a Paris Art University at age of 10. At first, she had no idea how to use her Insect Commander. She is in love with Kouhei, and her song was able to awaken the Astral Saber from its sleep. She was chosen by the Butterfly Insect Medal to become Ageha, whose armor was modeled after a butterfly. She used her Kniving Radar to scan for a fast-moving enemy.

Arsenal
  are the transformation devices used by all seven B-Fighters. They store the Neo Insect Armor which is activated when the users of the Command Voicer insert their respective data card and shout . The Command Voicers disappeared with the Astral Saber and Geist Axe after Jadow Mothera is defeated.
 : Sidearms for the main three B-Fighters. Activated with the Input Cards. Numbers as follows:
 IC-01. : Standard energy blast
 IC-02. : Blast of fire
 IC-03. : Blast of disrupting sound waves that stun enemies
 IC-04. : Blast of small needle-like darts
 IC-05. : Blast of cement that hardens when it hits its target
 IC-06. : Freezing blast of cold
 IC-07. : Blast of powerful air at high speeds
 : For the main three B-Fighters. These can fire , crossing two or three.
 : Kabuto's Finish Weapon.
 : Kuwagar's Finish Weapon.
 : Tentou's Finish Weapon.

New B-Fighter Weapons
 : Genji's weapon.
 : Min's weapons
 : Ageha's weapon, transforms from her Insect Commander and "Flower Weapon" Input Card.
 : Secondary weapons given to the main B-Fighters by the New B-Fighters
 : At first B-Fighter Yanma's weapon. Later given to B-Fighter Kabuto, who can attach in front of the Input Cardgun.
 : At first B-Fighter Genji's weapon. Also usable as a tranquilizer.
 : At first B-Fighter Min's weapon. Later given to B-Fighter Kuwagar to attach to the back of the Input Cardgun and give elemental powers of the six  including Water Power, Thunder Power, Flame Power, Light Power, Storm Power, and Earth Power.
 : Combination of Input Cardgun and the three Beet Arms. The Input Rifle is much more powerful than any other in the B-Fighters' arsenal.
 : The Astral Saber is a red and gold short sword with a red crystal ball in its hilt. Within this ball is a small mechanical kabutomushi beetle that is actually the giant Kabuterios. The Astral Saber was sleeping in a cave until Sophie Villeneuve's song woke it. Upon having the Dragonfly, Firefly, Cicada, Butterfly, Scorpion, Centipede, Mantis and Hornet Insect Medals put into the handle of the Astral Saber, B-Fighter Kabuto was able to call Kabuterios forth from the saber and join with the giant robot, gaining the B-Fighters a powerful ally. After Kabuterios and Kuwaga Titan first defeat each other, the hilt of the Astral Saber turns into stone, returning to normal in episode 41. It disappears after the final battle.
 : The Geist Axe is a green axe with a green crystal ball similar to the Astral Saber's in its hilt. Within it is a mechanical stag beetle that becomes the giant Kuwaga Titan. Initially, Descorpion was the wielder of the Geist Axe and the commander of Kuwaga Titan. After Kabuterios and Kuwaga Titan defeat each other, its hilt turned to stone, returning to normal in episode 41 with Mother Melzard as the new wielder. She lost the Axe in the next episode. Later in the finale, with the New B-Fighters' Insect Commanders merging into it, B-Fighter Kuwager got possession of the weapon and used the power of Kuwaga Titan for good. It disappears after the final battle.

Road Beetles
Each B-Fighter has a  providing his primary transportation.

 is Professor Osanai's prototype of the Road Beetle that can change into . Its name stands for "Operating system of Self-Awake Navigation with Accelerate-Interface-set-in 0 (zero)-Unit".

Neo Beet Machines
The  are the B-Fighters' super machines that they use to fight Melzard airborne and ground vehicles. The Beetle Base was blown up along with the Neo Beet Machines thanks to the efforts of Killmantis, Beezack, Dezzle and Dord near the finale.

  is Kabuto's Neo Beet Machine, a gold and black 6-wheeled vehicle with a rhinoceros beetle horn on the front. It can also tilt downward for  so that its horn can dig a trench in the ground to dig up underground enemies, and can throw an enemy in the  attack.
  is Kuwagar's Neo Beet Machine, a black tank with two pincer-like horns on the front. The Kuwaga Tank can grab enemies in these horns and toss them about. It can convert to Battle Formation, the front rising up and folding back, and can fire off its horns to hit enemies at long-range in the  attack.
  is Tentou's Neo Beet Machine, a small plane with two large turbines on its tail and two large wings with hover turbines on them. The Stealth Gyro can fire a blast of energy from its . In , it can transport the two Neo Beet Machines, attaching Kabutron and Kuwaga Tank to the underside of its wings.

Shell Gods
The two  are giant insect robot gods from space. Kabuterious and Kuwaga Titan were allies that fought a great battle and were swept into a vortex that defeated an evil foe. They were eventually encased inside two weapons, the Astral Saber and the Geist Axe, until they would be found in the present.

It normally stays inside the Astral Saber but can emerge and enlarge itself when needed. B-Fighter Kabuto can join with Kabuterios and control it.
It stays inside the Geist Axe until called forth, and was originally controlled by Descorpion, later by Mother Melzard, and was used for evil. However, Kuwaga Titan was (despite his title) not actually evil and once fought alongside Kabuterios. At the end of the series, the Geist Axe was claimed by the B-Fighters and allowed B-Fighter Kuwagar to use it to fight for good.

Allies
  is the Japan branch chief of Cosmo Academia.
  is the artificial lifeform in the computer of the Beetle Base that sends out alerts and analyzes data on enemies.
  is Kouhei's younger sister and his self-proclaimed manager, covering for him when he leaves school to fight Melzard. She is in love with Kengo. She was once put under a spell, when Mother Melzard gave her a pink/white flower armor-themed warrior.
  gave the original B-Fighters their powers. Though aged, he is still able to help the B-Fighters using his extensive knowledge of the Melzard. Guru died trying to protect the insects of the world from the "Dark Wave Motion" power of Dargriffon. He was buried in the cave where Takuya first found him as the B-Fighters' technology eventually fades, from the First Generation to the New Generation once they had defeated the Melzard.
  is Guru's son who left his father one hundred years before and traveled across the dimensions as a supplier of weapons and equipment. He returned to Earth to visit his mother's grave, bringing with him the Beet Ingram to give to Takuya Kai/Blue Beet years ago. When his father Guru died, he returned again to visit his father's grave.

First Generation of B-Fighters

The B-Fighters of the first generation sometimes appear and help out the new generation. After destroying the Jamahl, they were transferred to the Cosmo Academia branch. They occasionally aid the New Generation B-Fighters before Guru dies, destroying their ability to become B-Fighters.

  is the team leader who developed the Neo Insect Armors as the chief of the development project of the new B-Fighters. Now 28, he works at the New York office.
  is also 28 and works at the Europe branch.
  is 24.

Arsenal
  is a cannon type weapon that was developed at the New York head office.
  is a combination attack that upgraded the Sonic Flap.

Melzard Tribe
The  are an ancient race that have existed since prehistoric times. They dwell in the fortress , which Mother Melzard is an extension of.

  is a monster with a snake-like tail instead of legs who leads Melzard. She gave birth to the members by eating a fossil of any animal or plant with one of her tendrils and spitting it back out as an egg which instantly hatches into a Melzard. After the battle in which Kabuterios and Kuwaga Titan defeat each other, Mother Melzard fell asleep, gaining an eye on her left breast upon waking up and taking control of Kuwaga Titan. After a battle on the moon with Kabuterios, the Geist Axe was lost. Mother Melzard then proceeded to use a rain to implant bombs in all humans in a scheme to wipe out the entire population. When the B-Fighters entered her fortress, she fought them personally before activating the bombs, leaving only Kabuto unaffected. Severing her connection to the Melzardos, the New B-Fighters destroyed the detonator as the Melzardos crashes. But using the energy of the Earth, Mother Melzard evolved into a larger reptilian monster called . She then went on a city-smashing spree while overpowering Kuwaga Titan until he chopped her tail off. When Kabuterios was summoned, the two Shell Gods destroy Jadow Mothera.
  is the eldest son of Melzard. A powerful warrior with red Ceratopsia-like armor, he commanded the Melzard monsters based on land-dwelling creatures. Raija frequently quarreled with Dezzle, each trying to outdo the other. Sent to obtain the Insect Medals, Raija battled Kabuto one-on-one after his clone creation was destroyed. Though seemingly killed by Kabuto, Raija managed to take the Scorpion Insect Medal as his body petrified. Raija was later revived by Mother Melzard in a new maroon armored form, empowered by the magma deep within the earth. He found a rival in Descorpion, who also sought to defeat Kabuto. Surviving the Melzardos, Rajia overpowered Kuwagar before battling Kabuto and before being mortally wounded.
  is the second son of Melzard. Dezzle was Raija's constant rival and wore an elaborate blue costume with fins and an anglerfish-like helmet. He commanded the Melzard monsters based on water-dwelling creatures and often actively sabotaged Raija's plans. After Raija was killed, Dezzle was granted greater power from Mother Melzard and became  where he wields a trident. He was defeated by the Input Rifle with only his head remaining. Dord placed Dezzle's head on a tank. Dezzle was later revived by Mother Melzard in a new, mysterious form. His new form, giving him new power from the darkness of the deep sea, had a small torso, a black cape, and a white mask which hid his face. Dezzle later found the B-Fighters' base of operations, assuming Professor Osanai's form to activate the BF Base's self-destruct along with a virus to spread to the other branches. He overpowered Kuwagar and Tentou as Kabuto arrived. They took the fight outside while Professor Osanai deleted the virus. He almost killed Kabuto until he was hit by the Input Rifle. He accidentally fell into the Kabuto Lancer still latched unto Dord before he is killed by the Input Rifle.
  is Raija's comrade, a female warrior in light green insectoid armor who wields two red swords. When Raija was seemingly killed, she stayed by his petrified body until he awakened. Miolra survived the Melzardos only to die fighting Tentou.
  is the captain of Dezzle's Bodyguards, a squat creature whose head resembles an ammonite fossil. Dord looked after Dezzle's head after he was blown to pieces and remained as his loyal servant until Dezzle returned in his new form. Dord was killed alongside Dezzle by B-Fighter Kabuto with the Input Rifle after his shell was impaled by Kabuto's lance.
  are the Melzard's primary fighters against the B-Fighters. Raija and Dezzle gathered 4 of the 8 Insect Medals (first obtaining the Centipede Insect Medal, than the Bee, Mantis and the Scorpion Insect Medal afterwards) for Mother Melzard using energy gathered by Dezzle. She had four of her larval offspring merge into suits of armor powered by the medals. In their debut, the B-Crushers lured the B-Fighters into the open and sprang a trap. The B-Crushers overpower them until Mac Windy comes to aid as B-Fighter Yanma. Descorpion ordered a fall back as they proved their superiority. But in the second match, Kabuto defeated them. After B-Fighter Kabuto activated Kabuterios, the B-Crushers were injured and had to be cocooned until their wounds had healed. Afterwards, they gained possession of the Geist Axe. They also came to be at odds with Raija, Dezzle and their crew.
  is the leader of the B-Crushers. His armor was modeled after a scorpion. His rival is Raija, who also wants to defeat Kabuto. Once tried to kill Kabuto using a bomb attached to his belt buckle. He wielded the Geist Axe until Mother Melzard took it from him. When the B-Fighters enter the Melzardis, Descorpion fights them as Rajia and Miolra join in. Surviving the Melzardos' crash, Descorpion battles Kabuto. Accepting defeat, he was killed by Kabuto's Liner Blast.
  is the polar opposite of Descorpion, with armor modeled after a centipede. He uses the centipede legs on his armor to control ordinary humans via mind control, such as when he attempted revenge on Yanma. Leaving Melzard, he challenged the B-Fighters despite learning that he had a bomb inside him and then took Yui hostage. The New B-Fighters arrived and used their signature moves to weaken Mukadelinger before Kabuto defeated him with the Input Rifle. Mother Melzard activated the bombs and destroyed Mukadelinger.
  is a mantis-armored expert at using bladed weapons. Sent with Beezack to the Neo B-Machine hangar to destroy the mecha, Killmantis learned they'd been sent on a suicide mission where Kabuto wounded them. Near death, Killmantis sacrificed himself to complete his mission.
  is a hornet-armored master of disguise and illusion assuming human guides to lower his enemies' guard. Sent with Killmantis to the Neo B-Machine hangar to destroy the mecha. Like Killmantis, Beezack did not know they'd been sent on a suicide mission and sacrificed himself.
 The  are Melzard's foot soldiers who belong to either Raija and Dezzle.  seem to be made from the fossils of land creatures: 2 Stegoceras, 2 Pteranodons, and 2 prehistoric spiders.  seem to be made from the fossils of sea creatures: 2 prehistoric fish, 2 prehistoric jellyfish, and 2 prehistoric squids. They are disintegrated by Mother Melzard in episode 42.
 : Giant worm-like tanks can transform into the  aerial fighters, and vice versa.

Melzard Monsters
Monsters of the land and sea given birth by Mother Melzard.

Raija's Monsters
Raija's monsters are land-based creatures.

  is a deformed monster who was born from a woolly mammoth fossil. He was sent to begin a new Ice Age and kill all of humanity. Elebammoth froze everything in his path with his liquid nitrogen gas. When he froze Yui, Kouhei battled it and lost until the last Command Voicer flies into his hand as Kengo and Ran arrived. As Kabuto, Kouhei killed Elebammoth with the Cavalier Lancer attack.
  was born from a Tyrannosaurus fossil. Dinozaura had three heads, two Tyrannosaurus-like arms, and two tails for extra arms. He was sent to destroy the power lines and sources in the city to prevent Cosmo Academia from setting up the Neo Beet Machines. Dinozaura was soon defeated by the B-Fighters. He returned with powerful bombs in his heads for a kamikaze attack to take out the Neo Beet Machines. When the B-Fighters realized Dinozaura was not attacking powerlines as before, they got him to follow them to the countryside to finally kill him after his heads detached from his exploding body.
  was born from a Tyrrhenian mole fossil. He was weak at first until he ate a special fruit that empowered him. Mogerado was killed when Tentou blasted his sunglasses off, leaving him blinded by sunlight and vulnerable for the deathblow by Tentou's Crossway Slicer.
  is an ant monster with ant-like heads for hands who was born from a Titanomyrma fossil. She was sent to lay her eggs around Mount Fuji and as the eggs neared hatching, they began to rise in temperature, threatening to cause an eruption. Dezzle, intend on sabotaging his brother's plan, gave medicine to Baeria that would raise her body temperature. However, the temperature in Baeria kept rising making her a living bomb. Kabuto managed to freeze Baeria to reduce her temperature so he could finish her off without an explosion.
  was born from a giant kangaroo fossil. He stole the talents of various athletes by swallowing them in his pouch. He also swallowed Kengo. Gangaroo was killed by Kabuto after a lengthy battle.
  was born from half of a cactus fossil. He was finished off by Tentou. Zabodera's spirit was later summoned by Zanshoror.
  was born from a prehistoric giant vampire bat fossil. He was killed by Kabuto's Liner Blast. Zyren's spirit was later summoned by Zanshoror.
  was born from a Smilodon fossil. Dorafire looked like a near-skeletal mouse with a second tiger-striped smilodon's head on his forehead and smilodon-like hands. Dorafire could blast flamethrowers from his tiger head. After being briefly frozen, he was killed by Kabuto's Cold Laser/Liner Blast combo.
  was born from a fern fossil. Groba could sprinkle a destructive pollen from her head in battle. Killed by the combined weapons of all 3 B-Fighters.
  was born from a pineapple fossil. Pineappler was killed by one punch from Kabuto.
  was born from a Teratornis fossil. With flaps of his wings or a blast from his breath, Zarst could cause immense heat waves. This lasted until the B-Fighters killed him.
  was born from a prehistoric chameleon fossil. Killed by B-Fighter Tentou.
  was born from a Amphibamus fossil and looks like it was composed of many salamanders. Zanshoror brought the spirits of Zabodera, Zyren, and Isogilala to life. Kuwagar killed him.
  was a Triceratops monster born from a part of Raija's body. Driceraija could breathe fire and use a sword. He accompanied his parent in taking the Insect Medals from the powerless B-Fighters, setting the forest on fire to flush Kouhei and Takuya as they and the other B-Fighters were gathered in one place to be executed. Once the team regain their transformation abilities, Driceraija was killed by the B-Fighter's teamwork.

Dezzle's Monsters
Dezzle's monsters are water-based creatures.

  was born from a trilobite fossil and was sent to abduct the girls at Kouhei's school. His mission was to absorb the lifeforce from people through his tentacles and use it to enlarge himself to giant size. Zazanyoda was almost invincible until the B-Fighters fired at his weak point, the small trilobyte on his forehead. Reduced to his normal size, he was killed by the B-Fighters.
  was born from an Archelon fossil. The powder scraped from his shell was sold as a calcium supplement called "Bone-Health", but that hardened skin into bone. B-Fighters attacked Gamegeron, but his shell was too hard to be cracked. Gamegeron's only weaknesswas his belly, which he covered. Kabuto's determination finally shattered the monster's shell.
  was born from a Calliderma fossil. He could possess people and enhance their aggressive behavior. Targeting Kazuya Yano, the son of Kengo's late sensei Ryuzaburo Yano, he used the man's hatred for Kengo to wreak havoc across town. He uses smaller starfish parasites from his body to possess people, turning them into violent slaves under his control. The B-Fighters were forced to retreat as a result. The B-Fighters dispatched Kengo to fight Kazuya, while Kabuto and Tentou handled the angry mob. The two fortunately learned that electricity was the starfish-parasite's weakness. They freed the people with the Electric Shockwave just as Kengo freed Kazuya from Hitodenajiru's control, forcing the monster out of him. Once gathered, the B-Fighters learned that Electric ShockWave was useless on Hitodenajiru. But Kazuya's Triple Lightning Kick severely weakened Hitodenajiru enabling B-Fighter Kuwagar to finish him off.
  was born from a coelacanth fossil. B-Fighter Kuwagar singlehandedly killed him after Coelaganaza murdered Kuwagar's sister.
  was born from a Beelzebufo fossil. Hellgama was killed by Kabuto.
  was born from a prehistoric sea anemone fossil and killed by Tentou's Crossway Slicer. Isogilala's spirit was later summoned by Zanshoror.
  was born from a sea scorpion fossil. In battle, Kaizazora could detach/blast its arms and its combined head and stinger tail at opponents. After B-Fighter's Kabuto and Tentou hit his weak spot, he was killed by Kuwagar's Gravity Crush.
  is a Kappa-themed monster with no backstory. He was killed by Kuwagar.
  was born from a prehistoric scorpionfish fossil. Okozezeze could blast stinger darts from its mouth in battle. Okozezeze was killed by Kabuto's Liner Blast.

Other Monsters
Some of these creatures were both Raija and Dezzle's monsters.

  was a hybrid monster born from a Flores cave rat fossil and an prehistoric clam fossil, combining both their strengths. Nezugaira suffered a split personality: he was both a gentle creature and a sadistic monster. He was eventually killed by Tentou's Crossway Slicer.
  is a monster that resembles a gorgon from Greek Mythology with snake-headed tendrils and has no backstory. She was sent to retrieve the case containing four Insect Medals. Though killed by Super Blue Beet, Hebyusa's snake-headed tendrils infected the B-Fighters with her venom (first Kuwagar, then Tentou, G-Stag, Blue Beet, Reddle, and Kabuto) turning the two teams against each other until the viral venom is removed from the commanders.
  is a hybrid monster born from a prehistoric porcupine fossil and a prehistoric stingray fossil. Almost impossible to kill, Arajibiray could encase its victims in a cocoon that eventually killed them. With the help of a crystal that Genji found, Tentou used Impact Flash to finally kill Arajibiray.
  is a hybrid monster born from a prehistoric swordfish fossil, a Tyrrhenian mole fossil, and a prehistoric chameleon fossil. He could fire an acid that could melt the Neo Insect Armor (affecting both Kabuto and Tentou and later Min), change color to be invisible, and disappear, and digs underground. Tokasuzura was killed by the four B-Fighters: by Min with his Ringer Swords, Kuwagar with Gravity Crash, Tentou with Crossway Slicer, and Kabuto using the Input Rifle.
  is a unicorn-resembling monster and has no backstory. She was finished off by Kuwagar using the Input Rifle in a technique he called "Kuwagatic Buster".
  is a devil-resembling monster with no backstory. After using the Input Cardguns and Bloom Cannon to destroy Zadan's horn, he was killed by the B-Fighters' signature attacks.
  is a 2-faced griffin monster born from a cave lion fossil and a Haast's eagle fossil where it has an eagle head with a lion head above it. He is able to emit dark shockwaves from his chest to affect everything insect-related, and ensure the spread of darkness. Though he overpowered the new team, the first-generation B-Fighters arrive and managed to slow Dargriffon down with their newest weapon. The monster later returns. The B-Fighters hold it at bay until the original B-Fighters again appeared while Guru sacrifices himself. The original B-Fighters negated Dargriffon's power so the new team could finish him off with their signature attacks.

Episodes
 : written by Junichi Miyashita, directed by Shohei Tojo
 : written by Junichi Miyashita, directed by Shohei Tojo
 : written by Junichi Miyashita, directed by Kaneharu Mitsumura 
 : written by Junichi Miyashita, directed by Kaneharu Mitsumura 
 : written by Nobuo Ogizawa, directed by Hidenori Ishida
 : written by Akira Asaka, directed by Hidenori Ishida
 : written by Junichi Miyashita, directed by Shohei Tojo
 : written by Yasuko Kobayashi, directed by Shohei Tojo
 : written by Nobuo Ogizawa, directed by Kaneharu Mitsumura 
 : written by Akira Asaka, directed by Kaneharu Mitsumura 
 : written by Junichi Miyashita, directed by Osamu Kaneda
 : written by Kyoko Sagiyama, directed by Osamu Kaneda
 : written by Akira Asaka, directed by Hidenori Ishida
 : written by Yasuko Kobayashi, directed by Hidenori Ishida
 : written by Junichi Miyashita, directed by Shohei Tojo
 : written by Junichi Miyashita, directed by Shohei Tojo
 : written by Junichi Miyashita, directed by Kaneharu Mitsumura 
 : written by Kyoko Sagiyama, directed by Kaneharu Mitsumura 
 : written by Akira Asaka, directed by Hidenori Ishida
 : written by Nobuo Ogizawa, directed by Hidenori Ishida
 : written by Yasuko Kobayashi, directed by Shohei Tojo
 : written by Junichi Miyashita, directed by Shohei Tojo
 : written by Nobuo Ogizawa, directed by Kaneharu Mitsumura 
 : written by Kyoko Sagiyama, directed by Kaneharu Mitsumura 
 : written by Junichi Miyashita, directed by Osamu Kaneda
 : written by Junichi Miyashita, directed by Osamu Kaneda
 : written by Junichi Miyashita, directed by Osamu Kaneda
 : written by Junichi Miyashita, directed by Shohei Tojo
 : written by Junichi Miyashita, directed by Shohei Tojo
 : written by Kyoko Sagiyama, directed by Hidenori Ishida
 : written by Nobuo Ogizawa, directed by Hidenori Ishida
 : written by Akira Asaka, directed by Kaneharu Mitsumura 
 : written by Akira Asaka, directed by Kaneharu Mitsumura 
 : written by Junichi Miyashita, directed by Shohei Tojo
 : written by Junichi Miyashita, directed by Shohei Tojo
 : written by Yasuko Kobayashi, directed by Hidenori Ishida
 : written by Kyoko Sagiyama, directed by Hidenori Ishida
 : written by Junichi Miyashita, directed by Kaneharu Mitsumura 
 : written by Nobuo Ogizawa, directed by Kaneharu Mitsumura 
 : written by Yasuko Kobayashi, directed by Shohei Tojo 
 : written by Akira Asaka, directed by Shohei Tojo
 : written by Junichi Miyashita, directed by Hidenori Ishida
 : written by Akira Asaka, directed by Hidenori Ishida
 : written by Kyoko Sagiyama, directed by Kaneharu Mitsumura 
 : written by Nobuo Ogizawa, directed by Kaneharu Mitsumura 
 : written by Yasuko Kobayashi, directed by Shohei Tojo
 : written by Junichi Miyashita, directed by Shohei Tojo
 : written by Junichi Miyashita, directed by Shohei Tojo
 : written by Junichi Miyashita, directed by Hidenori Ishida 
 : written by Junichi Miyashita, directed by Hidenori Ishida

Cast
 Kouhei Toba, Clone Kouhei (15):  (Played as )
 Kengo Tachibana, Clone Kengo (15):  (Played as )
 Ran Ayukawa, Fake Ran (30): 
 Masaru Osanai: 
 Yui Toba: 
 Mack Windy: 
 Sophie Villeneuve: 
 Li Wen: 
 Julio Rivera: 
 Dinosaur Warrior Raija: 
 Insect Swordswoman Miola:

Voice actors
 Artificial Life Bit: 
 B-Fighter Yanma (eps-28-29): 
 Shell God Seal Sword Astral Saber: 
 Mother Melzard: 
 Deep Sea Fish-man Dezzle: 
 Rock Shell Chamberlain Dord: 
 Deadly Poison Armored General Descorpion: 
 Cold-Blooded Armored General Mukaderinger: 
 Demon Blade Armored General Killmantis: 
 Mirage Armored General Beezack:

Guest Stars
Takuya Kai (1, 25-27 & 47): Daisuke Tsuchiya
Sage Guru (1, 25–29, 32–35, 47): Yasuo Tanaka
Megumi Nakajima (2): Reiko Okabe
Takashi Nakajima (2): Kyohei Iizuka
Akane (3): Asuka Yamaguchi
Atsuko Endo (5): Mika Omine
Akio (5): Hiroshi Sakamoto
Yumiko (5): Eri Shimizu
Genzo (6): Kenichi Matsuno
Kikonosuke (6):Takeshi Yamazaki
Tatsuyoshi (6): Enryu Sanyutei
Yano Family (7)
Kazuya Yano: Kotaro Yoshida
Natsumi Yano: Masumi Ogawa
Ryuzaburo Yano: Satoshi Kurihara
Toshiya Hirano (8): Koichi Nagata
Teacher (8, 16): Yuzo Ogura
Shinosuke Ima (9): Shintaro Mizushima
Master (9): Takuya Haronobu
Eiji (10): Hidenori Tokuyama
Toru (10): Yoshiko Tonawa
Yamada (10): Akira Amamiya
Kohei's Friend (10, 14): Tsuyoshi Sugawara
Erika Shiraishi (11, 50): Tina Kawamura
Hiroshi (12): Kenta Uchino
Shunsuke (13, 50): Yūta Mochizuki
Haruka Satsuki (14): Megumi Nishimura
Mari Hayase (15): Rina Sato
Kazue Hayase (15): Mariko Sakai
Nurse (15): Hiroko Kamei
Naoya (16): Yasuyuki Fukuba
Doctor (17): Yoshiaki Wakao
Staff Member(17): Hirofumi Ishigaki
Lia/Kana (18): Asuka Umemiya
Lia (voice - 18): Yukari Nozawa 
Marina (19): Misao Oka
Swimming Club's Captain (19): Yoshiyuki Uchiyama
Yoshizo Hiraoka (20): Kazuma Suzuki
Tokuko Hiraoka (20): Kanako Nakatake
Kyoichi Nakagawa (21): Masahide Hirai
Reporter (21): Hideki Fukushi
Bunzo Kariya (22): Bunmei Tonamiyama
Bullies (23): Yugo Mori, Yuki Takamura, Yuichi Tada, Kazuki Ogawa
Chikako (24): Akane Kaiho
Daisaku Katagiri (25-27 & 47): Shigeru Kanai
Mai Takatori (25-27 & 47): Chigusa Tomoe
Beezack's human form (30): Akemi Fuji
Beezack's human form (32): Michihiko Hamada
People who listen Sophie's performance (32): Yoko Koyanagi
Cabin Attendant (34):Naoko Hiroshima
Doctor (37, 43): Toshio Matsuo
Announcer (42): Isao Kishimoto
Eri/Fake Eri (Zadan's human form)(44): Nanako Hotomi
Yukio Suzuki (44): Toshiya Baba
Yukio's mother (44): Jun Matsumoto
Museum Staff (45): Wataru Abe
BF Fans (45): Nagatoshi Saegusa, Yamato Tachikawa
Ryosuke Takano (46): Yosuke Ishii
Takano's wife (46): Rikako Sato
Takano's son (46): Yuta Suzuki
Boy who Yui cares in the hospital (50): Yusuke Osawa
Kabuto (voice) (50): Takahiro Yoshimizu

Songs
Opening theme

Lyrics: 
Composition: 
Arrangement: 
Artist: 
The song's full version is used as the ending for episode 50
Ending theme
 (1-49)
Lyrics: Yoko Aki
Composition: Ryudo Uzaki
Arrangement: Eiji Kawamura
Artist: Nobuhiko Kashiwara
The instrumental version is used as insert song for episode 50

External links
 

Japanese science fiction television series
Television series about insects
Fictional soldiers
Metal Hero Series
1996 Japanese television series debuts
1997 Japanese television series endings
TV Asahi original programming
Japan Self-Defense Forces in fiction